Shauna Brooks (born March 30, 1990) is an American actress, musical artist, and comedian. Brooks is also known as a transgender model, with notable appearances in Radar, Ebony, InTouch Weekly, OUT, People, and Galore. She has since been an advocate for LGBTQ rights and has spoken publicly about her work as a transgender model.

Career
Brooks has openly discussed her experience with transitioning. Since transitioning, she has been an LGBT activist.

In 2015, Brooks debuted on Discovery ID's program, Indecent Proposal, which documents her struggles as an adult companion and trans woman. Brooks later quit working as an upscale adult companion. 

In 2019, Brooks was a model in Stevie Boi's M3TAL collection in New York Fashion Week.

Media appearances

Television

Radio

Magazine features

Books
Shauna Brooks' books include Shade Built My Empire: From Shade To Paid (2017) and How I Came To Accept Him: Loving Your Child for Who They Are (2017).

References

1990 births
Living people
Transgender actresses
Transgender female models